
Year 269 BC was a year of the pre-Julian Roman calendar. At the time it was known as the Year of the Consulship of Gallus and Pictor (or, less frequently, year 485 Ab urbe condita). The denomination 269 BC for this year has been used since the early medieval period, when the Anno Domini calendar era became the prevalent method in Europe for naming years.

Events 
 By place 
 Sicily 
 The Mamertines, a body of Campanian mercenaries who have been employed by Agathocles, the former tyrant of Syracuse, capture the stronghold of Messana (Messina in north-eastern Sicily), from which they harass the Syracusans. The Syracusan military leader, Hieron, defeats them in a pitched battle at the Longanus River near Mylae, but Carthaginian forces intervene to prevent him from capturing Messana. His grateful countrymen then choose Hieron as their king and tyrant, to be known as Hieron II.

Births 
 Attalus I Soter, ruler of Pergamon, from 241 to 197 BC. He will be the first of the Attalid dynasty to assume the title of king (d. 197 BC).

Deaths

References